is a Japanese voice actress and singer associated with 81 Produce. She is a member of the idol voice actor group i☆Ris. In 2019, she won the Best Supporting Actress Award with Nao Tōyama in the 13th Seiyu Awards.

Personal life

Serizawa is the niece of singer Yuki Saito.

Discography

Extended plays

Singles

Filmography

Anime

Film animation
Pretty Rhythm All Star Selection: Prism Show Best Ten (2014), Ann Fukuhara
PriPara the Movie: Eeeeveryone, Assemble! Prism Tours (2015), Mirei Minami
PriPara Mi~nna no Akogare Let's Go PriPari (2016), Mirei Minami
 King of Prism: Pride the Hero (2016), Ann Fukuhara
 King of Prism: Shiny Seven Stars (2019), Ann Fukuhara

Original video animation
Mushibugyō (2014), Tenma Ichinotani
Nozo x Kimi (2014), Mirei Watanuki

Original net animation
Lost Song (2018), Monica Lux

Video games 
Idol Death Game TV (2016), Ayaka Tennouji
Granblue Fantasy (2017) (Vajra)
Girls' Frontline (2017) (PP-19) (FMG-9)
Princess Connect! Re:Dive (2018) (Ayane Hojo)
Honkai Impact 3rd (2019) (Liliya Olenyeva)
Dragalia Lost (2019) (Xiao Lei)
Grand Summoners (2019) (Amane) 
Root Film (2020) (Aine Magari) 
ALTDEUS: Beyond Chronos (2020), Julie
Blue Reflection: Second Light (2021), Yuki Kinjou
Azur Lane (2021), (IJN Chikuma)
Eve: Ghost Enemies (2022), (Naho Hodaka)
Action Taimanin (2022), (Shizuru Kousaka)
Heaven Burns Red (2022), (Karen Asakura)
Zenless Zone Zero (TBD), (Nicole Demara)

Dubbing

Live-action
The Best of Me, young Amanda (Liana Liberato)
Houdini, Erich Weiss (Louis Mertens)
The Hunter's Prayer, Ella Hatto (Odeya Rush)

Animation
A Turtle's Tale 2: Sammy's Escape from Paradise, Ricky

References

External links
  
 Official agency profile 
 

1994 births
Living people
Iris (Japanese band) members
Japanese video game actresses
Japanese voice actresses
Voice actresses from Tokyo
21st-century Japanese women singers
21st-century Japanese singers
81 Produce voice actors